Barvala Baval is a small village in Kunkavav Taluka of Amreli district of the Saurashtra region in the Indian state of Gujarat.

The village borders three districts; Amreli, Rajkot and Junagadh. It covers 8.75 km2.

Demographics 
The population was 2,585 in 2011 census.
Population
Census Parameter	Census Data
Total Population	2585
Total No of Houses	562
Female Population % 48.4% ( 1251)
Total Literacy rate % 74.2% ( 1917)
Female Literacy rate 33.1% ( 855)
Scheduled Tribes Population % 0.0% ( 1)
Scheduled Caste Population % 19.5% ( 503)
Working Population % 65.6%
Child(0 -6) Population by 2011	211
Girl Child(0 -6) Population % by 2011 50.2% (106).

Barvala Baval 2011 Census Details
Barvala Baval Local Language is Gujarati. Barvala Baval Village Total population is 2585 and number of houses are 562. Female Population is 48.4%. Village literacy rate is 74.2% and the Female Literacy rate is 33.1%.

Credit: www.censusindia.gov.in

Administration 
Pareshbhai Dhaduk serves as Sarpanch of the Gram Panchayat (village civic body).

Economy 
The primary occupations are diamonds, Embroidery, Construction and agriculture.

Recently One of the largest nationalized bank of Saurashtra The Amreli Jilla Madhyasth Sahkari Bank Limited opened its 71st branch in Barvala-Baval.

Education 
There are a pay-centre primary school managed by state government and Shrimati M.L.Paghdal High School for secondary education.

Religion 
Majority population of village follow Hinduism. Ramji Mandir is popular local temple. Dosapir Dargah is a religious place of Muslim community.and gangadhar mahadev temple is famous.

Transport 
The Vadiya-Devli Ancient Railway Station (Narrow Gauge) is nearby.

Barvala-Baval is situated 60 km from Amreli (headquarters), 5 km from Vadiya, 35 km from Gondal, 80 km from Rajkot, 25 km from Virpur and 28 km from Jetpur. Nearby villages include Bantva-Devli, Morvada, Khakhriya, Santhali, Khadkhad and Sultanpur.
Barvala Baval is a village in Kunkavav -vadia Taluka in Amreli District of Gujarat State, India.

Barvala Baval Pin code is 365480 and postal head office is Vadia.

Bhukhli-santhali ( 4 km ), Bantwa-devli ( 4 km ), Pipaliya Dhundhiya ( 5 km ), Morvada ( 5 km ), Khadkhad ( 6 km ) are the nearby Villages to Barvala Baval. Barvala Baval is surrounded by Bhesan Taluka towards South, Jetpur Taluka towards west, Gondal Taluka towards North, Bagasara Taluka towards South.

Amreli, Junagadh, Upleta, Lathi are the nearby Cities to Barvala Baval.	

This Place is in the border of the Amreli District and Junagadh District. Junagadh District's Bhesan is South towards this place.

Politics in Barvala Baval 
BJP, INC are the major political parties in this area. 
Police Stations /Booths near Barvala Baval.

1)Bantava Devli-2

2)Barvala Baval-1

3)Bantava Devli-1

4)Bambhniya-2

5)Vadia-3

How to Reach Barvala Baval 
By Rail
Vadiya Devli RailWay Station, Khakharia RailWay Station are the very nearby railway stations to Barvala Baval. How ever	Rajkot in RailWay Station is major railway station 74 km near to Barvala Baval.

References 

Villages in Amreli district